Ma Guorui (1915–2005) was a People's Republic of China politician. He was born in Nangong, Hebei. He was Chairman of the CPPCC Committee of his home province. He was a delegate to the 3rd National People's Congress and 5th National People's Congress and a member of the Central Advisory Commission.

References

1915 births
2005 deaths
People's Republic of China politicians from Hebei
Chinese Communist Party politicians from Hebei
Delegates to the 3rd National People's Congress
Delegates to the 5th National People's Congress
Members of the Central Advisory Commission
Chairmen of the CPPCC Hebei Committee
People from Nangong